The Lagos International Trade Fair Complex is a 350 hectare facility along Lagos-Badagry expressway hosting a number of market traders. The facility was constructed in the 1970s and planned to host an international trade fair upon fulfillment. In 2002, jewelry, auto spare parts and other consumer goods traders from Balogun Market on Lagos Island relocated to the complex. Today, the complex host traders representing a number of trade factions including Balogun Business Association, Auto Spare Parts And Machineries Dealers Association (ASPMDA), and jewelers under the banner of Association of Progressive Traders.

The facility was designed by Zoran Bojović and constructed by Energoprojeckt in partnership with the Nigerian government, it was opened in 1977 to coincide with the first Lagos International Trade Fair.  At fulfillment, it was the biggest project of Energoprojekt in Nigeria. The company and its designers including Bojovic also executed projects in Kano and Yola. It is theorized by Rem Koolhaas that Bojovic incorporated some of the architectural forms found in Kano into the designs of the trade fair complex.

The design of the complex placed emphasis on exposition pavilions, a demonstration hall was dedicated to the federal government while state governments also had their own halls, two halls were each dedicated to Nigerian and international corporations. Other facilities within the complex was a recreation park and an artificial lake adjacent to the park, a number of chalets, a press center, shopping stalls and a festival square.

Over the years, the infrastructure within the complex have been poorly maintained. The complex was concenssioned to a private firm in 2007 but that approval was abolished in 2018.

References 

Economy of Lagos
Buildings and structures in Lagos